The Physical Society of London, England, was a scientific society which was founded in 1874. In 1921, it was renamed the Physical Society, and in 1960 it merged with the Institute of Physics (IOP), the combined organisation eventually adopting the name of the latter society.

The society was founded due to the efforts of Frederick Guthrie, Professor of Physics at the Royal College of Science, South Kensington, and his assistant, William Fletcher Barrett. They canvassed support for a 'Society for physical research' and on 14 February 1874, the Physical Society of London was formed with an initial membership of 29 people. The Society's first president was John Hall Gladstone.

Meetings were held every two weeks, mainly at Imperial College London. From its beginning, the society held open meetings and demonstrations and published Proceedings of the Physical Society of London. The first Guthrie lecture, now known as the Faraday Medal and Prize, was delivered in 1914. In 1921 the society became the Physical Society, and in 1932 absorbed the Optical Society (of London). The Optical Society published Transactions of the Optical Society from 1899 to 1932.

In 1960, the merger with the Institute of Physics took place, creating the Institute of Physics and the Physical Society, which combined the learned society tradition of the Physical Society with the professional body tradition of the Institute of Physics. Upon being granted a royal charter in 1970, the organisation renamed itself as the Institute of Physics.

Presidents of the Physical Society

1874–1876 John H. Gladstone
1876–1878 George C. Foster
1878–1880 William G Adams
1880–1882 The Lord Kelvin of Largs
1882–1884 Robert B. Clifton
1884–1886 Frederick Guthrie
1886–1888 Balfour Stewart
1888–1890 Arnold W. Reinold
1890–1892 William E. Ayrton
1892–1893 George F. FitzGerald
1893–1895 Arthur W. Rucker
1895–1897 William de W. Abney
1897–1899 Shelford Bidwell
1899–1901 Oliver J. Lodge
1901–1903 Silvanus P. Thompson
1903–1905 Richard T. Glazebrook
1905–1906 John H. Poynting
1906–1908 John Perry
1908–1910 Charles Chree
1910–1912 Hugh Longbourne Callendar
1912–1914 Arthur Schuster
1914–1916 Sir Joseph Thomson
1916–1918 Charles V Boys
1918–1920 Charles Herbert Lees
1920–1922 Sir William Bragg
1922–1924 Alexander Russell
1924–1926 Frank Edward Smith
1926–1928 Owen W. Richardson
1928–1930 William H. Eccles
1930–1932 Sir Arthur Eddington
1932–1934 Alexander O. Rankine
1934–1936 Lord Rayleigh
1936–1938 Thomas Smith
1938–1941 Sir Allan Ferguson
1941–1943 Sir Charles Darwin
1943–1945 Edward N de Costa Andrade
1945–1947 David Brunt
1947–1949 George Ingle Finch
1949–1950 Sydney Chapman
1950–1952 Leslie Fleetwood Bates
1952–1954 Richard Whiddington
1954–1956 Harrie S. W. Massey
1956–1958 Nevill F. Mott
1958–1960 John A. Ratcliffe

Other use of the name

In November 2021, a number of members of the civil disobedience group Extinction Rebellion succeeded in infiltrating and briefly disrupting the Lord Mayor’s Show by appearing in the parade using a float disguised under the name of The Physical Society of London.

References

 Information from NAHSTE (Navigational Aids for the History of Science Technology & the Environment).

See also
 Science Abstracts

Scientific organizations established in 1874
Regional and local learned societies of the United Kingdom
Physics societies
1874 establishments in England
1960 disestablishments in England
Organizations disestablished in 1960
Clubs and societies in London
Science and technology in London